Pseudolycaena is a Neotropical genus of butterfly in the family Lycaenidae.

Species

 Pseudolycaena  cybele (Godman & Salvin, 1896)
 Pseudolycaena damo (Druce, 1875)
 Pseudolycaena dorcas (H. H. Druce, 1907)
 Pseudolycaena marsyas (Linnaeus, 1758)
 Pseudolycaena  nellyae (Lamas, 1975)

Distribution
Species of this genus occur in Central and South America from Mexico to Argentina.

References

 "Pseudolycaena Wallengren, 1858" at Markku Savela's Lepidoptera and Some Other Life Forms

Eumaeini
Lycaenidae of South America
Lycaenidae genera
Taxa named by Hans Daniel Johan Wallengren